The 2017 Nice Toruń FIM Speedway Grand Prix of Poland was the 11th race of the 2017 Speedway Grand Prix season. It took place on October 7 at the Marian Rose MotoArena in Toruń, Poland.

Riders 
First reserve Peter Kildemand replaced Greg Hancock, second reserve Martin Smolinski replaced Nicki Pedersen, third reserve Max Fricke replaced Niels-Kristian Iversen and fourth reserve Václav Milík Jr. replaced Fredrik Lindgren. The Speedway Grand Prix Commission also nominated Paweł Przedpełski as the wild card, and Bartosz Smektała and Igor Kopeć-Sobczyński both as Track Reserves.

Results 
The Grand Prix was won by Poland's Patryk Dudek, who beat Tai Woffinden, Bartosz Zmarzlik and Matej Žagar in the final. It was the first Grand Prix win of Dudek's career, which kept alive the title race as championship leader Jason Doyle was eliminated in the semi-finals.

Heat details

Intermediate classification

References

See also 
 Motorcycle speedway

Poland
Speedway Grand Prix
Grand